The Fisherman's Walk Cliff Railway, or Southbourne Cliff Railway, is a funicular railway in Southbourne, a seaside suburb of the English seaside resort of Bournemouth.  The line serves to link the seaside promenade and beach with the cliff top and the town behind.

Overview
The line is owned and operated by Bournemouth, Christchurch and Poole Council and has the following technical parameters:

Technical parameters
 Length: 
 Gradient: 1:1.49 (67.11%)
 Cars: 2
 Capacity: 12 passengers per car
 Configuration: Double track
 Gauge: 
 Traction: Electricity

History
Opened in 1935 by Bournemouth Corporation, Fisherman's Walk Cliff Railway is the most recent of the town's three lines. Traction was originally provided by a  electric motor, although this was replaced in the 1960s. The passenger cabs were replaced with newer versions in April 2012. Fisherman's Walk Cliff Railway is credited as the shortest funicular in the world by the 2015 Guinness Book of Records.

Nearby funiculars
There are two other cliff railways in Bournemouth, the West Cliff Railway and the East Cliff Railway (closed since 2016). All three operate between April and October.

Use as an arts venue
On Sunday 6 May 2018, Bournemouth-based sound and performance artists Language, Timothy! performed a site-specific theatre performance called 'Sound Journeys: The Longest Second' across both passenger cars of the Fisherman's Walk Cliff railway.  The piece - two, one-minute vignettes created especially for the Southbourne railway - was a commission for Bournemouth Emerging Arts Fringe (BEAF) Festival 2018.  Over 500 passengers saw one or both halves of the piece which ran for four hours during usual cliff lift operating hours.

See also 
 List of funicular railways

References

External links

 The official council page for the lifts, including prices
 Article on Bournemouth's Cliff Railways from The Heritage Trail web site
 Article on Bournemouth's Cliff Railways from the Funicular Railways of the UK web site
 Language, Timothy! "Sound Journeys: The Longest Second" event listing on BEAF website

Transport in Bournemouth
Funicular railways in the United Kingdom
Tourist attractions in Bournemouth
5 ft 8 in gauge railways in England
Guinness World Records